Gouna Irie (born 15 May 1970) is an Ivorian handball player. She competed in the women's tournament at the 1988 Summer Olympics.

References

1970 births
Living people
Ivorian female handball players
Olympic handball players of Ivory Coast
Handball players at the 1988 Summer Olympics
Place of birth missing (living people)